Bancasi Airport (Butuanon: Tugpahanan hong Bancasi;), also known as Butuan Airport, is the airport serving the general area of Butuan and Agusan del Norte. It is the only airport in Agusan del Norte and the largest in Caraga. The airport is classified as an International Airport by the Civil Aviation Authority of the Philippines (CAAP), a body of the Department of Transportation (DOTr) that is responsible for the operations of not only this airport but of all the other airports in the Philippines, except the major international airports.

Improvement projects
The Department of Transport and Communications (DOTC) announced that the airport would receive Php 45.5 million pesos in subsidy for expansion of the apron, improvement and expansion of vehicular parking area, construction of drainage system, and construction of concrete hollow block fence, with bidding scheduled to open to contractors on July 5, 2012.

Airlines and destinations

Accidents and incidents
 On October 26, 2007, Philippine Airlines Flight 475 from Manila, operated by an Airbus A320-200 registered as RP-C3224, overshot the runway of Butuan Airport after landing. Nineteen injuries were reported.
 On February 15, 2014, Cebu Pacific Flight 220, an Airbus A319-100 registered as RP-C3195, went off the runway of the airport on a flight to Mactan–Cebu when the nose gear and left main gear departed the paved surface of the runway during a 180-degree backtrack. 105 passengers were on board. No injuries were reported whatsoever.

See also
List of airports in the Philippines

References

Airports in the Philippines
Buildings and structures in Butuan
Transportation in Mindanao